Askari (also Romanized as ‘Askarī; also known as ‘Asgarī and Boneh-e ‘Askarī) is a village in Angali Rural District, in the Central District of Bushehr County, Bushehr Province, Iran. At the 2006 census, its population was 56, in 11 families.

References 

Populated places in Bushehr County